Guyon Philips (born 15 October 1993, in Arnhem) is a Dutch professional footballer who currently plays as a striker for Víðir. He formerly played for Go Ahead Eagles, FC Oss, FC Volendam, Víkingur Ó., Alta.

Career

In 2018, Philipps left Oss for Víkingur Ó. in Iceland.

References

External links
 Voetbal International profile 
 

1993 births
Living people
Dutch footballers
Dutch expatriate footballers
Footballers from Arnhem
Association football forwards
Go Ahead Eagles players
TOP Oss players
FC Volendam players
SC Telstar players
Achilles '29 players
Ungmennafélagið Víkingur players
Alta IF players
Eredivisie players
Eerste Divisie players
Tweede Divisie players
Dutch expatriate sportspeople in Iceland
Dutch expatriate sportspeople in Norway
Expatriate footballers in Iceland
Expatriate footballers in Norway